Muhammad Kaif Raza Khan, a descendant of Ahmed Raza Khan Barelvi, is an Indian Muslim cleric. He is the president of Dargah Ustad-e-Zaman Trust.

Personal life 

Raza Khan is the great-grandson of Ala Hazrat and his younger brother Hassan Raza Khan, the founder of the Barelvi movement. He belongs to the Barech tribe of the Pushtuns. He is the nephew of Maulana Tauqeer Raza Khan.

Statements and views

Definitely recite the Ala Hazrat Salaam in Ajmer 
President of Dargah Ustad-e-Zaman Trust, Maulana Qadri has expressed his displeasure over Ajmer's Khadim Sarwar Chishti stopping Barelvi Ulema from giving speeches and saluting, distributing literature. Every Sunni Barelvi Muslim has immense respect for Mu'in al-Din Chishti. Maulana Qadri said that on 27 January 2023 all of us will go to Ajmer.

After reaching the Ajmer Sharif Dargah will present the Nazrana of Salat-o-Salam with Adab and Ahtram (respect). Maulana Qadri said that Ala Hazrat Imam Ahmed Raza Khan Fazile Barelvi has taken the education and message of Hazrat Khwaja Garib Nawaz to the masses.  For decades, Sunni Barelvi Ulema and Akidtmand read Naat and Mankabat and Kalam of Ala Hazrat in the Dargah premises of Ajmer. Dargah is not anyone's property.

Demanding an apology from Swedish government 

On 21 January 2023 Rasmus Paludan was permitted by Swedish police to organise a demonstration in front of the Turkish embassy in Stockholm and set fire to the Quran with a lighter, Maulana Kaif Said:

"We strongly condemn the desecration of Quran-e-Pak and burning of Quran in Sweden.This act of Sweden has hurt the faith of Muslims all over the world and the Muslims are angry against Sweden.  We strongly condemn this act of the Swedish government.  Our country India is a secular nation which respects all religions, so we demand from you that this act of Swedish government should be strongly condemned on behalf of India.  Pressure should be made on the Swedish government to apologize to the Swedish government for allowing the burning of the Quran.  On behalf of India, pressure should be made on the Swedish government to punish Rasmus Paludan, a Swedish citizen who burnt the Holy Quran."

Demand to expel Salman Hasan from Jamaat Raza-e-Mustafa 

On 29 January 2023 Asjad Raza Khan son-in-law Salman Hasan met Ajmer Dargah Khadim Syed Sarwar Chishti, Maulana Kaif Said:

"What was the need for Salman Hasan to meet Sarwar Chishti?  Who gave them this permission?  He said that shortly before this meeting, Khadims had beaten up the Barelvis in Garib Nawaz's Urs on Saturday late night. Salman Hasan met the same Khadims and also invites them to come to Bareilly Sharif, how can this be understood. Maulana Kaif also said that when Maulana Tauqeer Raza Khan works for Ittehad, fingers are pointed at him.  And why is there silence on the issue of Salman Hasan."

See also
 Ahmed Raza Khan
 Mustafa Raza Khan
 Hamid Raza Khan
 Naqi Ali Khan
 Tauqeer Raza Khan
 Asjad Raza Khan
 Akhtar Raza Khan

References 

Indian Muslims
1999 births
Living people